The 1958 United States Senate election in Massachusetts was held on November 4, 1958. Democratic incumbent John F. Kennedy was reelected to a second six-year term, defeating Republican candidate Vincent J. Celeste.

Democratic primary

Candidates
 John F. Kennedy, incumbent Senator since 1953

Results
Senator Kennedy was unopposed for renomination.

Republican primary

Candidates
 Vincent J. Celeste, East Boston attorney and candidate for U.S. Representative in 1950 and 1952

Results
Celeste was unopposed for the Republican nomination.

General election

Candidates
 Vincent J. Celeste, East Boston attorney and candidate for U.S. Representative in 1950 and 1952 (Republican)
 Lawrence Gilfedder, perennial candidate (Socialist Labor)
 John F. Kennedy, incumbent Senator since 1953 (Democratic)
 Mark R. Shaw, perennial candidate (Prohibition)

Campaign
Kennedy was overwhelmingly popular in Massachusetts and the 1958 elections were a wave election favoring the Democratic Party. Celeste's campaign was poorly funded but the candidate worked 17-hour days, running his campaign out of his law offices and attempting to frame the race as one pitting a working-class child of Sicilian immigrants against "that millionaire Jack Kennedy."

The Kennedy campaign had bought and produced thousands of pieces of campaign material with the slogan "Be Proud of Your Vote!" but scrapped them after Celeste's nomination, as Senator Kennedy's father Joe thought the slogan could alienate Italian-Americans and divide the state on ethnic lines.

Results
Kennedy defeated Celeste by a margin of 874,608 votes; this represented the largest margin of victory in a statewide Massachusetts election up to that point.

References

Mas
1958
Senate
John F. Kennedy